Brian Phillips (born March 30, 1954) is a Canadian former competitive swimmer who won four medals in major international championship events during the early 1970s.  Phillips won a total of six medals in major international championships, including the FINA World Championships, Pan American Games and Commonwealth Games.

As a 17-year-old at the 1971 Pan American Games in Cali, Colombia, Phillips won silver medals as a member of the second-place Canadian teams in the 4x100-metre freestyle and 4x200-metre freestyle relay events.  The following year, he represented Canada at the 1972 Summer Olympics in Munich, West Germany, where he competed in three events.  He was again a member of the Canadian relay teams in the 4x100 and 4x200-metre freestyle relay events, finishing fifth and seventh, respectively, in the event finals.

In 1973, he won a bronze medal swimming for the Canadian team in the men's 4×100-metre medley relay at the 1973 World Aquatics Championships in Belgrade.  In his final international appearance at the 1974 British Commonwealth Games in Christchurch, New Zealand, he won a gold medal in the 4×100-metre freestyle relay with teammates Bruce Robertson, Gary MacDonald and Ian MacKenzie, and another gold in the 4x100-metre medley relay with Robertson, Steve Pickell and William Mahony.  Individually, he also won a bronze in the men's 100-metre freestyle.

See also
 List of Commonwealth Games medallists in swimming (men)

References

1954 births
Living people
Swimmers from Winnipeg
Canadian male freestyle swimmers
Olympic swimmers of Canada
Swimmers at the 1971 Pan American Games
Swimmers at the 1972 Summer Olympics
Swimmers at the 1974 British Commonwealth Games
World Aquatics Championships medalists in swimming
Pan American Games silver medalists for Canada
Commonwealth Games medallists in swimming
Commonwealth Games gold medallists for Canada
Commonwealth Games bronze medallists for Canada
Pan American Games medalists in swimming
Medalists at the 1971 Pan American Games
Medallists at the 1974 British Commonwealth Games